The Charlotte, Columbia and Augusta Railroad was formed in 1869 with the merger of the Charlotte and South Carolina Railroad and the Columbia and Augusta Railroad.

Route

Stations

 Charlotte, 0 miles
 0 kilometers
 Morrow's (Now Pineville), 11

 Fort Mills, 18

 Rock Hill, 26

 Smith's, 35

 Lewis, 38

 Chester, 45

 Cornwall's, 53

 Black Stock, 57

 Yonguesville, 60

 White Oak, 64

 Adger's, 67

 Winnsboro, 72

 Simpson's, 78

 Ridgeway, 84

 Doko, 91

 Killian's, 97

 Columbia, 107

 Lexington, 124

 Gilbert Hollow, 134

 Leesville, 141

 Batesville, 143

 Ridge Spring, 153

 Johnston, 162

 Mile's Mill, 173

 Graniteville, 183

 Augusta, 195 miles

Track gauge

Ownership changes
The railroad was acquired by the Richmond and Danville Railroad in 1878 and officially merged into the Richmond & Danville in 1882. The latter went into receivership in 1892 and the Charlotte, Columbia and Augusta was foreclosed in the following year. It was sold to Southern Railway on July 10, 1894. After the acquisition in 1894, the Charlotte, Columbia and Augusta name was dropped and the Southern moniker was used.

Tickets
The Charlotte, Columbia and Augusta Railroad printed fare tickets in $1, $2, $5 and $10 denominations that resembled US currency with the vignette of a steam locomotive on the front. The $1 fare ticket was good for one person for 20 miles. The $2 fare was good for two people 20 miles. The $5 fare was good for one person 100 miles and the $10 fare was good for two people 100 miles. Many businesses along the railroad would accept the railroad fare notes as currency for goods.

References

Defunct Georgia (U.S. state) railroads
Defunct North Carolina railroads
Defunct South Carolina railroads
Predecessors of the Southern Railway (U.S.)
Railway companies established in 1869
Railway companies disestablished in 1894
1869 establishments in Georgia (U.S. state)
5 ft gauge railways in the United States
American companies established in 1869